Combe-Capelle is a Paleolithic and Epipaleolithic site situated in the Couze valley in the Périgord region of Southern France. Henri-Marc Ami carried out excavations in the area from the late 1920s until his death in 1931.

The famous Homo sapiens fossil from Combe-Capelle, discovered in 1909 was sold to the Museum für Völkerkunde, Berlin, in 1910. It was for a long time considered to be 30,000 years old, an Upper Paleolithic Cro-Magnon man and one of the oldest finds of modern humans in Europe, formerly classified as Homo aurignaciensis hauseri.
This was revised in a 2011 study,  which dated collagen from a tooth of the skull in Berlin   with accelerator mass spectrometry. The fossil was found to date to the  early Holocene (Mesolithic Europe), at 9,500 years old.

See also
 List of human evolution fossils#Holocene

References

1909 archaeological discoveries
Archaeological sites in France
Mesolithic Homo sapiens fossils
Périgord